The highest-grossing live music artists (also known as "highest-grossing touring artists") are reported by Billboard and Pollstar boxscores. The cumulative figures may be incomplete because not all concert dates are reported by either publications.

The Rolling Stones are the highest-grossing live music act of all time, collecting over $2.5 billion according to Billboard Boxscore. The band is followed by U2, who also passed two-billion mark in concert revenue. Concert industry is very male-dominated, and the only women to gross more than $1 billion are Madonna, Celine Dion, and Beyoncé; with Madonna being the first woman to score that sum.

All-time ranking

Pollstar

Billboard

Decade ranking

2000s

2010s

See also
 List of highest-attended concerts
 List of highest-grossing concert tours
 List of highest-grossing concert residencies

Notes

References

Concerts
Entertainment-related lists of superlatives
Lists of concerts and performances